The 1974 Preakness Stakes was the 99th running of the $210,000 Grade 1 Preakness Stakes thoroughbred horse race. The race took place on May 18, 1974, and was televised in the United States on the CBS television network. Little Current, who was jockeyed by Miguel A. Rivera, won the race by seven lengths over runner-up Neopolitan Way. Approximate post time was 5:41 p.m. Eastern Time. The race was run on a track listed as good in a final time of 1:54-3/5.  The Maryland Jockey Club reported total attendance of 54,911, this is recorded as second highest on the list of American thoroughbred racing top attended events for North America in 1974.

Payout 

The 99th Preakness Stakes Payout Schedule

The full chart 

 Winning Breeder: John W. Galbreath; (KY)
 Winning Time: 1:54 3/5
 Track Condition: Good
 Total Attendance: 54,911

References

External links 
 

1974
1974 in horse racing
Horse races in Maryland
1974 in American sports
1974 in sports in Maryland
May 1974 sports events in the United States